Oleksandr Ushkalenko (born 2 August 1964) is a Ukrainian cross-country skier. He competed in the men's 30 kilometre classical event at the 1998 Winter Olympics.

References

External links
 

1964 births
Living people
Ukrainian male cross-country skiers
Olympic cross-country skiers of Ukraine
Cross-country skiers at the 1998 Winter Olympics
Sportspeople from Sumy